Hot Country Songs is a chart that ranks the top-performing country music songs in the United States, published by Billboard magazine.  In 2006, 23 different songs topped the chart in 52 issues of the magazine, based on weekly airplay data from country music radio stations compiled by Nielsen SoundScan.

The number one song at the start of the year was "Must Be Doin' Somethin' Right" by Billy Currington, which had reached number one in the issue of Billboard dated December 31, 2005, and remained at the top until the issue dated January 14 when it was replaced by "She Let Herself Go" by George Strait.  This gave Strait his 40th number one, tying the record held by Conway Twitty for the highest number of Hot Country Songs number ones.  Strait returned to the top spot in September with "Give It Away" to take the record outright.

Nine acts achieved their first number one in 2006. The first was Carrie Underwood, winner of the fourth season of American Idol, who had previously achieved a number-one hit on the Hot 100, but reached the top of the country chart for the first time in January with "Jesus, Take the Wheel", which spent six weeks in the top spot,  the longest run of the year at number one.  Later in the year Underwood spent a further five weeks at number one with "Before He Cheats", giving her a total of eleven weeks at number one in the year, the most of any act.  Other artists to achieve the feat of a debut number one in 2006 included Josh Turner, Jack Ingram, Jason Aldean, Rodney Atkins, The Wreckers, and Heartland.  Veteran rock band Bon Jovi scored its first ever country hit and went all the way to number one after releasing a country version of its song "Who Says You Can't Go Home" featuring vocalist Jennifer Nettles.  In December, the band Sugarland, of which Nettles is a member, gained its own debut number one with "Want To", which was the final number one of the year.

Chart history

See also
2006 in music
List of artists who reached number one on the U.S. country chart

References

2006
United States Country Singles
2006 in American music